Fred Martin (born 4 October 1966) is an Australian former sprinter who competed in the 1984 Summer Olympics.

References

1966 births
Living people
Australian male sprinters
Olympic athletes of Australia
Athletes (track and field) at the 1984 Summer Olympics
Athletes (track and field) at the 1990 Commonwealth Games
Commonwealth Games competitors for Australia